Marthasville is or was the name of two places in the United States:

Marthasville, Missouri
Marthasville, Georgia, briefly the name of Atlanta from 1843 to 1845